Philtrum Press is a small publishing house run by Stephen King. This small press operation, operating out of King's front business offices in Bangor, Maine, is primarily run by King's personal assistant, Marsha DeFillipo (who is also the moderator of the Stephen King Website Message Board).

At least the following have been published:
 The Plant, part 1 (1982), serialized, epistolary novel written by Stephen King
 The Plant, part 2 (1983)
 The Eyes of the Dragon (1984), novel written by Stephen King, 1000 copies, Signed/Limited
 The Plant, part 3 (1985)
 The Ideal Genuine Man (1987), a novel written by Don Robertson, 
 Six Stories (1997), a short story collection written by Stephen King, 1100 copies, Signed/Limited
 The New Lieutenant's Rap (1999), a short story written by Stephen King, 500 copies (approx.), Signed/Limited
 Guns (2013), an essay written by Stephen King, published as a 25-page e-book

References

External links

Book publishing companies based in Maine
Stephen King